was a Japanese politician who served as Governor of Tokyo from 1995 to 1999.  He is also well known as a TV actor, novelist, film director, screenwriter and songwriter.

Early life and artistic career 
Yukio was born in Nihonbashi ward of Tokyo City in 1932. His father was an entrepreneur who had been running a bento catering business. He began writing manzai comedy while enrolled as a student at Waseda University and made his debut as a comedy writer in Japan's fledgling television industry.

He produced, directed and starred in the film , which was a contestant in the 1966 Cannes Film Festival. His first novel, won the Naoki Prize in 1981.

Aoshima wrote for popular comedian Hitoshi Ueki and was largely responsible for creating Ueki's image. According to Ueki, Aoshima once told him: "Don't tell anyone you don't drink, otherwise you'll put me out of a job." Aoshima wrote the hit 1961 song , performed by Hajime Hana and the Crazy Cats, of which Ueki was a member. Aoshima characterized the song as "the saga of a happy-go-lucky salaryman who is unable to avoid the temptations of drink and gambling" with the resonant lyric "I know it's wrong, but I can't give it up." He linked the song to his political views later on, writing that "we have spent several decades creating a society and economy oriented towards mass production, mass distribution, mass consumption, and mass waste. We know something is amiss, but we are so caught up in it that we cannot give it up."

Political career

House of Councillors
Aoshima was elected to the House of Councillors in the 1968 election as a national block write-in candidate, capitalizing on his fame to win 1.2 million votes and placing second in the block behind Shintaro Ishihara. He refused to give outdoor speeches in the style of other Japanese politicians, and instead went on a trip to Europe during the campaigning season. He nonetheless remained in the Diet until 1995, when he resigned to run for Governor of Tokyo. He was part of the Dainiin Club, a minor political party composed of independent candidates in the House of Councillors.

Governor of Tokyo
Aoshima ran for Governor of Tokyo in 1995, without major party support and again without campaigning beyond state-sponsored posters and TV spots. Knock Yokoyama, also a comedian, was elected as governor of Osaka Prefecture in the same election cycle.

As governor, Aoshima cancelled a costly "World City" exposition that Governor Shun'ichi Suzuki planned to have held in Odaiba in 1996, calling it a "legacy of the bubble economy era". In the wake of this act, which had formed the bulk of the basis for Aoshima's gubernatorial campaign, his administration was viewed as largely ineffective. He resigned after four years in office, by which time he was known as "Mr. Broken Manifesto".

During his tenure as governor, Aoshima became the target of an assassination attempt in May 1995, when a parcel bomb was mailed to his Tokyo office. The bomb, intended for Aoshima, exploded in the face of his assistant, severely wounding him. It is believed that the bomb was mailed by members of the Japanese doomsday cult Aum Shinrikyo. Aum member Naoko Kikuchi was accused of the bombing but was acquitted after a trial in 2015.

Aoshima ran for the House of Councillors again in the 2001 election and the 2004 election but failed to win a seat. He died of myelodysplastic syndrome in December 2006 at the age of 74.

References 

1932 births
2006 deaths
Deaths from myelodysplastic syndrome
Male actors from Tokyo
Politicians from Tokyo
Writers from Tokyo
Waseda University alumni
Japanese television writers
Japanese male television actors
Japanese male film actors
Japanese film directors
Japanese lyricists
Members of the House of Councillors (Japan)
Governors of Tokyo
Japanese actor-politicians
20th-century Japanese novelists
20th-century Japanese musicians
Naoki Prize winners
Male television writers
20th-century screenwriters